Mafia: The Game of Survival is a 2016 Russian science fiction action film directed by Sarik Andreasyan and written by Andrei Gavrilov. It was inspired by a popular party game, Mafia. The movie was released in Russia on January 1, 2016.

Plot 
Moscow,  2072. The card game Mafia became the most popular television show in the world. Eleven people gather at the table to find out —  who are innocent civilians and who is ruthless Mafia. The world is going to see a cocktail of emotions and feelings: fear, lie, pain, pride, passion, love and death. The winner will receive a huge cash prize, and the loser will just die.

Cast

 Viktor Verzhbitsky as Supreme Organizer game
 Veniamin Smekhov as Luka Sergeyevich
 Yuri Chursin as Konstantin
 Vyacheslav Razbegaev as Vladimir
 Andrey Chadov as Ilya
  as Kirill
 Violetta Getmanskaya as Katerina
  as Mariya
 Eugene Koryakovsky as Pyotr
 Alexey Grishin as Krivoy
 Artyom Suchkov as Ivan
  as Psychologist 
 Vsevolod Kuznetsov as Lead Voice
 Alexander Gagarinov as Kirill's friend

Release
The film was released in Russia on January 1, 2016. It was released in China on October 14, 2016.

Reception

Box office
It is considered a box office bomb.

Critical reception
Reception of Mafia: The Game of Survival in Russian media was negative. It was largely ignored by mainstream critics, because Enjoy Movies did not screen the movie for press. According to review aggregator Kritikanstvo.ru, only 8 reviews were published, and most of them were strongly negative, including reviews from KG-Portal, 25 Kadr and Kinokadr.

See also
 Mafia (party game)

References

External links
 

2016 3D films
2016 science fiction action films
2016 computer-animated films
Films about death games
Films based on games
Films set in Moscow
Films set in the 2070s
IMAX films
Mafia films
Russian 3D films
Russian science fiction action films
Films set in 2072